"Bully" is the lead single from American rock band Shinedown's fourth studio album, Amaryllis.

Meaning
Speaking to Rolling Stone, Shinedown front man Brent Smith discussed the lyrics of the song as "about not feeling like you can't stand up for yourself and take back your self respect if you feel as if someone is belittling you or trying to push you around. The song is not condoning violence. What it is condoning is survival. I don't think that anyone should ever have their self-respect or their dignity taken from them."

He also mentioned that his father had instructed him on how to defend himself against bullies. "When I was ten years old, my dad took me to the garage and put a pair of boxing gloves on me and said, 'I don't ever want it to come to this, but you need to learn how to fight.' And I got my butt kicked sometimes, but I always stood up for myself. By nature I've just never backed down from what I believed in, and I'll be damned if I'm going to let someone push me around. It's the same thing with my family, too. I wouldn't let someone come into my house and mess with my girlfriend or my son."

Release
The song was released on January 3, 2012.

Music video
The official video premiered on the band's YouTube channel on March 6, 2012. The video was directed by Darren Doane, who previously directed the video for "Sound of Madness".

The Ohio State University Marching and Athletic bands
A version of "Bully" was arranged by John Brennan for the 2012 football season for the Ohio State University Marching and Athletic bands. It is played as a pep song by the marching band at football games and by the athletic band at basketball (and hockey) games.

Charts

Weekly charts

Year-end charts

Certifications

References

Shinedown songs
2012 singles
Song recordings produced by Rob Cavallo
Songs about bullying
2012 songs
Songs written by Dave Bassett (songwriter)
Atlantic Records singles
Songs written by Brent Smith